Punjab & Maharashtra Co-operative Bank Limited (PMC), is a multi-state co-operative bank that began operations in 1983. It has 137 branches spread over half a dozen states of India and nearly 100 branches are in Maharashtra. It is regulated by the Reserve Bank of India and registered under the Cooperative Societies Act.

It also has branches in  Karnataka, Goa, Delhi, Madhya Pradesh and Gujarat.

On 23 September 2019, the RBI imposed operational restrictions on PMC Bank for six months. Due to this, the bank account holders are not allowed to withdraw more than ₹1,000 from their accounts during this period of restrictions. On 26 September 2019, the restrictions have been eased and a total of  could be withdrawn by customers. On 5 November, 2019 decided to increase the prescribed withdrawal limit to ₹ 50,000.

The Reserve Bank of India (RBI) on 19 June 2020 doubled the withdrawal limit for Punjab and Maharashtra Cooperative Bank's depositors to Rs 100,000 from Rs 50,000 earlier. 

Joy Thomas, the MD of the bank, was suspended. He admitted the exposure of the bank to the troubled realty company HDIL and also stated that the company had been violating the RBI rules for 5–6 years now.

To solve this, HC appointed the three-member committee to oversee the sale of assets of Housing Development Infrastructure (HDIL) to pay the depositors of Punjab and Maharashtra Co-operative Bank (PMC Bank). HDIL, its promoters Rakesh and Sarang Wadhawan, and a few former officials are accused of committing a fraud on PMC Bank. Public interest litigation filed in the high court, seeking the setting up of a committee to speed up the auction of HDIL's assets to pay depositors, has claimed that the realty firm owed  to the bank. The court said if the proceeds from the sale were insufficient to pay the dues, the committee would identify and dispose of the properties of other companies owned or promoted by the Wadhawans which were mortgaged with the PMC Bank, but with paripassu charge of other financial
Due to the restrictions and not providing any solution to the account holders and share holders of PMC Bank there is a loss of trust amongst the people of India towards the failed banking System, towards the Reserve Bank of India and towards the Government of India

See also 
Co-operative banking
List of banks in India

References 

PMC Bank scam: ED attaches HDIL group's shares worth Rs 233 crore
https://www.indiatoday.in/india/story/pmc-bank-case-ed-attaches-hdil-group-shares-worth-rs-233-crore-1848546-2021-09-02

External links 
Official website

Banks established in 1983
Cooperative banks of India
Banks based in Mumbai
Indian companies established in 1983
1983 establishments in Maharashtra